The 2011 Fórmula Truck season was the 16th Fórmula Truck season, the South American championship began on February 27 at Santa Cruz do Sul, while Brazilian Championship on April 3 in Rio de Janeiro and ended on December 4 at Brasília after ten rounds.

Felipe Giaffone and Volkswagen won the title of South American and Brazilian championships.

Teams and drivers
All drivers were Brazilian-registered, excepting Luis Pucci, who raced under Argentine racing license.

Calendar
For the 2011 season of Fórmula Truck was created the South American Championship with three races, the first in Santa Cruz do Sul along with the Top Race,  the second at Interlagos and the third in Argentina on Juan y Oscar Gálvez also with Top Race. Two changes occurred in the calendar, Santa Cruz do Sul replaces  Velopark and Campo Grande leaves the calendar for the return to Goiânia.

Key:

Results

Championship standings
Points were awarded as follows:

Drivers' championships

Brazilian

Notes
The top five after the race ensures a place on the podium.

Piquet scored no points in Brasília.

South American

Manufacturers' championships

Brazilian

Notes
Three best trucks of each brand.

South American

References

External links
 Official website of the Fórmula Truck (in Portuguese)

Formula Truck
Fórmula Truck seasons